The 1882 Newfoundland general election was held in 1882 to elect members of the 14th General Assembly of Newfoundland in the Newfoundland Colony. The Conservative Party led by William Vallance Whiteway formed the government.

 Bay de Verde
 Levi Garland
 Bonavista Bay
 George Skelton
 Francis Winton
 Burgeo-LaPoile
 Alexander M. Mackay
 Burin
 James Spearman Winter Conservative
 John E. P. Peters
 Carbonear
 A. Penney
 Ferryland
 Daniel Joseph Green
 Augustus F. Goodridge Conservative
 Fortune Bay
 James O. Fraser
 Harbour Grace
 Ambrose Shea Liberal
 Charles Dawe
 Harbour Main
 Joseph I. Little
 Richard MacDonnell Liberal
 Placentia and St. Mary's
 Albert Bradshaw
 Michael Tobin
 Smith McKay
 Port de Grave
 John Bartlett
 St. George's (election held October 21, 1882)
 Michael H. Carty
 St. John's East
 Robert J. Kent Liberal (speaker)
 J. J. Dearin
 Robert J. Parsons Liberal
 St. John's West
 Patrick J. Scott
 Philip D. White
 James J. Callanan
 Trinity Bay
 William V. Whiteway Conservative
 Robert Bond Liberal
 Joseph Boyd
 W. J. S. Donnelly Liberal
 Twillingate-Fogo
 R. P. Rice
 Jabez P. Thompson
 White Bay (election held October 21, 1882)
 John H. Boone

References 
 

1882
1882 elections in North America
1882 elections in Canada
Pre-Confederation Newfoundland
1882 in Newfoundland